In enzymology, a hypotaurine dehydrogenase is an enzyme that catalyzes the chemical reaction

hypotaurine + H2O + NAD+  taurine + NADH + H+

The 3 substrates of this enzyme are hypotaurine, H2O, and NAD+, whereas its 3 products are taurine, NADH, and H+.

This enzyme belongs to the family of oxidoreductases, specifically those acting on a sulfur group of donors with NAD+ or NADP+ as acceptor.  The systematic name of this enzyme class is hypotaurine:NAD+ oxidoreductase. This enzyme participates in taurine and hypotaurine metabolism.  It has 2 cofactors: heme,  and Molybdenum.

References 

 

EC 1.8.1
NADH-dependent enzymes
Heme enzymes
Molybdenum enzymes
Enzymes of unknown structure